Nine News is a radio news service providing the half-hourly radio news bulletins to radio stations across Australia.

History
On 16 September 2009, Macquarie Radio Network shut down its news website, livenews.com.au after two years of existence, citing poor financial returns.

In April 2015, following the merger of Macquarie Radio Network and Fairfax Radio Network, the newsroom of 2UE Sydney was closed and replaced with the 2GB feed. Local bulletins on 3AW, 4BC and 6PR now take the Macquarie National News branding. This branding was retained until the renaming of Macquarie Media as Nine Radio in 2020.

In July, the newsroom shared between 1116 SEN and 3MP 1377 in Melbourne was closed, replaced with the Macquarie National News service from 3AW.

On 1 January 2020, the Macquarie service was replaced by Nine News, which commenced providing the half-hourly radio news bulletins to radio stations across Australia.

Stations
Bold signifies a Nine Radio owned station.

State bulletins

New South Wales
 2GB / 2UE
2GN
Alive 90.5
Eagle FM
Hawkesbury Radio
Hope 103.2
SWR 99.9 FM

Victoria
 3AW Melbourne
 1116 SEN Melbourne
 3BA Ballarat
 3MP 1377 Melbourne
 3NE Wangaratta 
 Magic 1278 Melbourne
 Radio KLFM Bendigo / Castlemaine

Queensland
 4BC / 4BH

Western Australia
 6PR
 6IXNational bulletin
New South Wales
 Alive 90.5 Baulkham Hills
 2AAA Wagga Wagga
 2AY Albury-Wodonga
 2MIA Griffith
 2QN Deniliquin
 2WEB Bourke

Victoria
 Bay 93.9 Geelong (Weekends only)
 Edge FM 102.1 Wangaratta
 K Rock 95.5 Geelong (Weekends only)
 3CS Colac
 3HA Hamilton
 3SH Swan Hil
 3WM Horsham
 3YB Warrnambool
 3KND Melbourne

Queensland
 Hot Country Queensland Dalby / Goondiwindi / St George / Roma
 West FM Charleville
 4HI Emerald
 4LM Mount Isa
 4SB Kingaroy
 4VL Charleville
 4ZR''' Roma

Northern Territory
 104.1 Territory FM Darwin

Former stations
 MTR 1377 Melbourne, Victoria (closed)
 Sky Sports Radio Sydney / Regional New South Wales (replaced with local newsroom at weekdays / AIR News at weekends)
 2CH

References

Nine Radio
Australian radio programs